Video logging is a process in which video footage is watched and labeled according to its content.

Logging in post-production 
If a video has a high shooting ratio, it can be impractical to remember exactly where each shot is on each source tape or source file. Finding a particular source shot by searching through hours of video during editing can be time consuming, as well as tie up expensive editing equipment and editors' time.

A solution widely employed in the professional industry is to log the content prior to editing. Loggers go through the source video material, labeling it according to its contents within the metadata. This data is then available during editing, making the editing more efficient.

Software based logging systems allow clip lists to be imported directly into computer based editing systems.

Broadcast and compliance logging 
Free-to-Air and Subscription broadcasters often have a statutory requirement to keep a record of all programs that are emitted. This may be for legal or other compliance purposes—or simply good commercial sense to 'have proof' of events in event of a contrary claim.

Traditionally compliance recordings were made to long-play video-cassette decks, using three 8-hour tapes per day per channel. The unreliability of moving tapes & heads, along with the move to centralcasting and distributed playback requirements, has made this method virtually impossible to maintain in the current operational climate.

Larger multi-channel broadcasters with hundreds of feeds running simultaneously could potentially use several thousand VHS decks in rotation, along with the equipment racking, tape storage space and staff to manipulate those assets—and tens of thousands of tapes required to span the compliance retention period.

Developments since the early 2000s have shifted to multi-channel server-based rich-media logging, with a few brave souls using domestic PVR software to achieve the basic functionality at a reduced cost. 

Since 2005, more advanced systems such as the Actus Digital Intelligent Monitoring Platform were introduced and provide data sync to broadcast automation systems, as well as alerts on basic signal status, event logging for review of non program related events which may have been visible on air, and notification of non-compliance with federal regulations such as requirement to broadcast Closed Captions and CALM Act Compliance. 

In addition to logging to disk, some packages also provide live streaming for internal use, or to be repurposed to external web or news sites.

A variety of disk-based compliance logging packages suitable for a range of customer applications are available—each employing a number of proprietary methods and technologies.

See also 
 CatDV
 Blackbird
 Actus Digital at http://ActusDigital.com

References 

Film and video technology
Television technology